Tāmati Wāka Nene (1780s–1871) was a Māori chief of the Ngāpuhi iwi.

Waaka may also refer to:

 Waga sculpture, a type of Ethiopian memorial carving
 Cheryl Moana Waaka (born 1970), female New Zealand rugby union player
 Gugi Waaka (1938–2014), New Zealand musical entertainer
 Maureen Waaka (1942–2013), Miss New Zealand 1962
 Te Kari Waaka (1916–1991), New Zealand Ringatu minister